Mühlbach is a small river of Bavaria, Germany. It is a right tributary of the Gleiritsch in Lampenricht.

See also

List of rivers of Bavaria

Rivers of Bavaria
Rivers of the Upper Palatine Forest
Rivers of Germany